Crown Equerry is a title of the head of the Swedish Royal Stables. It is also an honorary title awarded by the king of Sweden. Previously at the Royal Court there was also a Master of the Horse who had the highest oversight of the Royal Stables. The Crown Equerry who was head of the Royal Stables, was named First Crown Equerry. Today Colonel Ulf Gunnehed is the Crown Equerry and head of the Royal Stables.

Order of precedence
According to the order of precedence the Crown Equerry had following ranks before 1909:

Uniform
Since 1875 the Crown Equerry carry a uniform consisting of a light blue single-breasted waffenrock with white piping and a stand-up collar decorated with oak leaf pattern. The parade uniform has epaulettes, a waist belt with gold tassels, and bicorne with white plume.

List of Crown Equerries

First Crown Equerries
This is an incomplete list of First Crown Equerries:
1886–1912: Gustaf Gyldenstolpe
1912–1929: Eberhard Rosenblad (1911)
1929–1950: Charles d’Otrante
1950–1972: Carl Eric von Platen

Crown Equerries
1972–1984: Hans Skiöldebrand
1984–1991: Hodder Stjernswärd
1991–1996: Magnus Olson
1996–2003: Jörn Beckmann
2003–2015: Mertil Melin
2015–20xx: Ulf Gunnehed

List of non court-serving Crown Equerries
This is an incomplete list of non court-serving First Crown Equerries and Crown Equerries:

Non court-serving First Crown Equerries
1890–1910: Gustaf d’Otrante 
1918–1939: Edvard Sager 
1918–1935: Carl Wachtmeister 
1925–1937: Carl Gustaf von Platen

Non court-serving Crown Equerries
1896–1918: Edvard Sager
1901–1931: Gösta Tamm
1908–1918: Carl Wachtmeister
1911–1925: Carl Gustaf von Platen
1916–19??: Clarence von Rosen
1916–????: Carl Bonde
1923–1936: Adolf Hamilton
1927–1934: Carl Hallenborg
1930–1938: Magnus Palmstierna
1930–19??: Carl-Philip Klingspor
1931–1943: Fabian Wrede
1932–19??: Wilhelm von Essen
1933–19??: Claës Wachtmeister
1933–1941: Nils Gyllenkrok
1935–1946: Claës König
1946–1950: Hodder Stjernswärd

See also
Master of the Horse

References

Swedish monarchy
Swedish titles